Title 3 of the United States Code outlines the role of the President of the United States in the United States Code.

Chapter 1—Presidential Elections and Vacancies
This chapter deals with elections for President every four years, and vacancies.

 § 1. Time of appointing electors
 § 2. Repealed
 § 3. Number of electors
 § 4. Vacancies in electoral college
 § 5. Certificate of ascertainment of appointment of electors
 § 6. Duties of Archivist
 § 7. Meeting and vote of electors
 § 8. Manner of voting
 § 9. Certificates of votes for President and Vice President
 § 10. Sealing and endorsing certificates
 § 11. Transmission of certificates by electors
 § 12. Failure of certificates of electors to reach President of the Senate or Archivist of the United States; demand on State for certificate
 § 13. Same; demand on district judge for certificate
 § 14. Repealed
 § 15. Counting electoral votes in Congress
 § 16. Same; seats for officers and Members of two Houses in joint session
 § 17. Same; limit of debate in each House
 § 18. Same; parliamentary procedure at joint session
 § 19. Vacancy in offices of both President and Vice President; officers eligible to act
 § 20. Resignation or refusal of office
 § 21. Definitions
 § 22. Severability

Chapters 2–5 
 : Office and Compensation of President
 : Protection of the President; United States Secret Service Uniformed Division
 : Delegation of Functions
 : Extension of Certain Rights and Protections to Presidential Offices

References

External links
U.S. Code Title 3, via Office of the Law Revision Counsel
U.S. Code Title 3, via Cornell University
United States Code Title 3, via Wikisource 

03
Title 03